Marcelo Demoliner and João Souza were the defending champions but  decided not to compete together.
Souza teamed up with Víctor Estrella, but lost in the final.
Demoliner teamed up with Thiemo de Bakker but lost in the semifinals.

Guillermo Durán and Máximo González won the title, defeating Estrella and Souza in the final, 3–6, 6–1, [10–5].

Seeds

Draw

Draw

References
 Main Draw

Aberto de Tenis do Rio Grande do Sul - Doubles
2013 Doubles